Kawish Television Network (KTN) is the first private Sindhi TV channel in Pakistan. It is the most-watched private Sindhi-language general entertainment television channel worldwide. The channel is part of the Kawish Group.

History
The channel was founded by Muhammad Aslam Kazi in 2002 and started with 6 hours of transmission. It has now grown from a small regional-language channel to the leading Satellite Channel of Pakistan, broadcasting 24 hours a day to areas of South Asia, Middle, and Far East Asia. It also started the first-ever music channel in the Sindhi language, KASHISH TV. After that, in October 2007, KTN News started airing, covering news, current affairs programs, talk shows, documentaries, and reports.

KTN Group
The most popular and most widely distributed Sindhi newspaper, Daily Kawish, is also part of the same group.
Kashish, a music channel, is part of the KTN network.
KTN NEWS, news and current affairs channel, airing 24-hour bulletins and talk shows.
Chaalis Channel, regional entertainment channel, 24-hour movies and dramas.
Platform Productions is a major distributor of television content to KTN and "Kuch Reh Jeewiyal Pall", Alif Laila being some of the best shows that are part of the Platform Productions collection.

Revolution

KTN has also brought a revolution in regional-language channels in Pakistan and has given rise to other Sindhi and regional-language channels in the near past.

It also brought a new wave and genre of shows in the regional and Sindhi television world with a new show titled "Kuch Reh Jeewiyal Pall", which is doing very well and has gathered high audience interest. This show completed 100 episodes on Friday, 4 May 2007, which in itself is a landmark in the Sindhi television industry.

KTN currently has established its mark in the 6-6:30 pm time slot with a daily show, Alif Laila, based on the famous Arabian Nights.

See also

References

Television stations in Pakistan
Television networks in Pakistan
Television stations in Karachi
Television channels and stations established in 2002
2002 establishments in Pakistan
Sindhi-language mass media